The 1991 Mercedes Cup,  was a men's tennis tournament played on outdoor clay courts and held at the Tennis Club Weissenhof in Stuttgart, Germany that was part of the Championship Series of the 1991 ATP Tour. It was the 14th edition of the tournament was held from 15 July until 21 July 1991. First-seeded Michael Stich won the singles title.

Finals

Singles

 Michael Stich defeated  Alberto Mancini, 1–6, 7–6(11–9), 6–4, 6–2
 It was Stich's 2nd singles title of the year and the 3rd of his career.

Doubles

 Wally Masur /  Emilio Sánchez defeated  Omar Camporese /  Goran Ivanišević, 4–6, 6–3, 6–4

References

External links
 Official website 
 ITF tournament edition details
 ATP tournament profile

Stuttgart Open
Stuttgart Open
Mercedes Cup
Mercedes Cup